The 1981 Yugoslavian motorcycle Grand Prix was the sixth round of the 1979 Grand Prix motorcycle racing season. It took place on the weekend of 15–17 June 1979 at the Automotodrom Rijeka.

Classification

500 cc

References

Yugoslav motorcycle Grand Prix
Yugoslavian
Motorcycle Grand Prix